Kiribati competed at the 2015 Pacific Games in Port Moresby, Papua New Guinea from 4 to 18 July 2015. A total of 86 competitors for Kiribati were listed as of 4 July 2015.

Athletics

Kiribati qualified 6 athletes in track and field:

Women
 Teinnang Ueata

Men
 David Birati
 David Peter
 John Ruka
 Utiraoi Takaria
 Itaaka Temwaka

Basketball

Men
 Tewaieta Bangke
 Choi Being Yeeting
 Raurenti Beeta
 Cliff Collins
 Areieta Lefulefu
 Tauro Palai
 Iotia Paul
 Teekia Rui
 Biremon Taakami
 Puti Tongatapu

Boxing

Powerlifting

Table tennis

Kiribati qualified one athlete in table tennis:

Men
 Teingia Taburimai

Taekwondo

Kiribati qualified 3 athletes in taekwondo:

Women
 Tokataake Mwemweata

Men
 Teingia Taburimai
 Nelson Tabaua

Tennis

Touch rugby

Kiribati qualified men's and women's touch rugby teams (22 players):

Women
4th – Women's tournament
 Kimarawa Mourongo
 Taoriba Biniati
 Marebu Tekaai
 Tokaratororo Tikataake
 Lucy Ioneba
 Maritere Bani
 Joan Tonga
 Marenoa Tebakia
 Anee Taake
 Temaateke Kaero

Men
7th – Men's tournament
 Rhynner Riwata
 Moantau Tiaontin
 Kiatamoa Kautuna
 James Ruateiti
 Titau Tautii
 Tebubua Mweia
 Aviata Kenana
 Ukenio Teurakai
 Ribae Amoti
 Tuteau Pine
 Korimaraa Matang
 Tibaua Taraitebure

Volleyball

Weightlifting

References

Pac
Nations at the 2015 Pacific Games
Kiribati at the Pacific Games